The 1998–99 season was Cardiff City F.C.'s 72nd season in the Football League. They competed in the 24-team Division Three, then the fourth tier of English football, finishing third, winning promotion to Division Two.

Players

  

 

First team squad.

League table

Results by round

Fixtures and results

Third Division

Source

Worthington Cup (League Cup)

FA Cup

Auto Windscreens Shield

FAW Premier Cup

See also
List of Cardiff City F.C. seasons

References

Bibliography

Welsh Football Data Archive

1998-99
Welsh football clubs 1998–99 season
1998–99 Football League Third Division by team